Lieutenant General Jean-Marc Lanthier,  is a retired Canadian Army officer who served as Commander of the Canadian Army from July 2018 to July 2019. He was Vice Chief of the Defence Staff from July 2019 to his announcement of retiring in March 2020.

Military career
Lanthier was commissioned as an armoured officer in the Canadian Armed Forces in 1989. He became commanding officer of the 12e Régiment blindé du Canada and went on to be commander of 5 Canadian Mechanized Brigade Group. After that he became Deputy Commanding General Sustainment I Corps, a unit of the United States Army, in June 2011, Commander of 2nd Canadian Division in July 2013, and Commander Canadian Army Doctrine and Training Centre in July 2014, before becoming Chief of Programme in April 2017.
 
Lanthier was appointed Commander of the Canadian Army on 16 July 2018. A year later, on 18 July 2019, he succeeded Lieutenant General Paul Wynnyk as Vice Chief of the Defence Staff.

References

|-

Year of birth missing (living people)
Living people
Canadian generals
Commanders of the Order of Military Merit (Canada)
Recipients of the Meritorious Service Decoration
Canadian military personnel of the War in Afghanistan (2001–2021)
Commanders of the Canadian Army